Josh Harris Smith (born August 7, 1997) is an American professional baseball infielder for the Texas Rangers of Major League Baseball (MLB). He made his MLB debut in 2022.

Amateur career
Smith attended Catholic High School in Baton Rouge, Louisiana. He was drafted by the Detroit Tigers in the 38th round of the 2016 MLB draft, but did not sign and attended Louisiana State University (LSU), where he played college baseball for the LSU Tigers. He started for the Tigers as a freshman, hitting .281/.407/.409/.816 with 5 home runs and 48 RBI. Smith played in the Cape Cod League in the summer of 2017 for the Harwich Mariners, hitting .382/.478/.513/.991 with 3 home runs and 12 RBI. Smith missed all but six games of his sophomore year due to a stress reaction in his back. He returned as a starter in his junior year, hitting .346/.433/.533/.966 with 9 home runs and 41 RBI.

Professional career

New York Yankees
The New York Yankees selected Smith in the second round, with the 67th overall selection, of the 2019 MLB draft. He signed with New York for a $967,700 signing bonus. He played for the Staten Island Yankees following his signing, hitting .324/.450/.477/.927 with three home runs and 15 RBIs over 33 games. He did not play in 2020 due to the cancellation of the Minor League Baseball season due to the COVID-19 pandemic. Smith started the 2021 season with the Tampa Tarpons of Low-A Southeast and was promoted to the Hudson Valley Renegades of High-A East, hitting a combined .324/.448/.641/1.089 with 9 home runs, 24 RBI, and 17 stolen bases.

Texas Rangers
On July 29, 2021, the Yankees traded Smith, along with Glenn Otto, Ezequiel Durán, and Trevor Hauver, to the Texas Rangers in exchange for Joey Gallo and Joely Rodríguez. He was assigned to the Hickory Crawdads of the High-A East; after nine games with Hickory, the Rangers promoted Smith to the Frisco RoughRiders of the Double-A Central. Smith spent his 2022 season minor league time with the Round Rock Express of the Triple-A Pacific Coast League, hitting .290/.395/.466/.861 6 home runs, 45 RBI, and 9 stolen bases over 55 games. 

On May 30, 2022, Texas selected Smith's contract and promoted him to the major leagues for the first time. He made his MLB debut that night versus the Tampa Bay Rays. He recorded his first career hit, a single off Drew Rasmussen, and finished the game with three hits. Smith was placed on the injured list with a sprained left AC joint on June 4. On July 11, 2022, Smith hit an inside-the-park home run against the Oakland Athletics, the first home run of his career. Over 73 games for Texas in 2022, Smith hit .197/.307/.249/.556 with 2 home runs and 16 RBI.

References

External links

LSU Tigers bio

1997 births
Living people
Sportspeople from Baton Rouge, Louisiana
Baseball players from Louisiana
Major League Baseball infielders
Texas Rangers players
LSU Tigers baseball players
Danville Dans players
Harwich Mariners players
Staten Island Yankees players
Tampa Tarpons players
Hudson Valley Renegades players
Hickory Crawdads players
Frisco RoughRiders players
Round Rock Express players